Youngbloods is the second studio album by Australian metalcore band the Amity Affliction. It was released on 18 June 2010 through Boomtown Records. It debuted at number 6 on the ARIA Charts. Grammy-nominated producer Machine produced Youngbloods. The drums were recorded at Breakwater Music Studio in Hazlet, NJ. All other tracks were recorded at the Machine Shop in Weehawken, NJ. This is the first and the only record to feature guitarist Clint Owen Ellis (Splattering), where Troy Brady temporarily switched to rhythm guitar for Ellis to take the lead. It's also the last record that features keyboardist Trad Nathan.

US pop punk band Four Year Strong contribute to the gang vocals on "I Hate Hartley". Helmet Roberts does guest vocals on "Fuck the Yankees". "15 Pieces of Flare" is a bonus track that comes with the iTunes download of the album. Prior to the release of Youngbloods, the band updated their website with updates on their writing and recording process with Machine.

It was nominated for a 2010 ARIA Award for Best Hard Rock/Heavy Metal Album but lost to the Australian band Parkway Drive. It was awarded "Album of the Year 2010" by Blunt Magazine.

Track listing

Personnel
The Amity Affliction
Joel Birch – unclean vocals
Ahren Stringer – clean vocals, bass
Troy Brady – rhythm guitar
Clint Owen Ellis – lead guitar
Trad Nathan – keyboards, synths, programming, samples
Ryan Burt – drums, percussion

Certifications

References

2010 albums
The Amity Affliction albums
Albums produced by Machine (producer)